Below is a list of the largest consumer markets of the world, according to data from the World Bank. The countries are sorted by their Household final consumption expenditure (HFCE) which represents consumer spending in nominal terms. If measured by purchasing power parity (PPP) terms, China is estimated to be the largest consumer economy today.

See also
List of countries by Human Development Index
List of countries by percentage of population living in poverty
List of countries by GDP (nominal)
List of countries by GDP (PPP)
List of countries by GDP (nominal) per capita
List of countries by GDP (PPP) per capita

References

Sources
United Nations Statistics Division - National Accounts Main Aggregates Database

Consumer market
Consumer market